Kim Hyun may refer to:
 Kim Hyun (footballer)
 Kim Hyun (actress)